Harmony is a Swedish Christian metal band from Borås, Sweden, where they formed in 2000. They have released three studio albums, Dreaming Awake (2003), Chapter II: Aftermath (2008), and Theatre of Redemption (2014), and two extended plays, End of My Road (2008) and Remembrance (2015).

Background
Harmony is a progressive power metal band from Borås, where they formed in 2000. Its former members are vocalist  Henrik Båth, bassist Andreas Olsson, and keyboardist Magnus Holmberg. The band's current members are vocalist Daniel Heiman, guitarist Markus Sigfridsson, bassist Raphael Dafras, keyboardist John Svensson, and drummer Tobias Enbert.

Music history
Harmony's first studio album, Dreaming Awake, released in April 2003, was its only recording with Massacre Records. The subsequent extended play, End of My Road, was released on August 11, 2008, from Ulterium Records. Harmony released Chapter II: The Aftermath, on October 31, 2008, with Ulterium Records. Its third studio album, Theatre of Redemption, was released on December 2, 2014, by Ulterium Records. The second extended play, Remembrance, was released on May 22, 2015, from Ulterium Records.

Members

Current members
 Daniel Heiman – lead vocals (2010–present)
 Markus Sigfridsson – guitar (2000–present)
 Raphael Dafras – bass (2014–present)
 John Svensson – keyboards (2014–present)
 Tobias Enbert – drums (2000–present)

Former members
 Henrik Båth – lead vocals (2000–2010)
 Andreas Olsson – bass (2002–2014)
 Magnus Holmberg – keyboards (2002–2014)

Discography
Studio albums
 Dreaming Awake (April 2003, Massacre)
 Chapter II: The Aftermath (October 31, 2008, Ulterium)
 Theatre of Redemption (December 2, 2014, Ulterium)
EPs
 End of My Road (August 11, 2008, Ulterium)
 Remembrance (May 22, 2015, Ulterium)

References

External links
 
 CMnexus profile
       

Musical groups established in 2000
Swedish musical groups
Massacre Records artists